Weisi Lin is a professor at the School of Computer Science and Engineering of Nanyang Technological University, Singapore. He was named Fellow of the Institute of Electrical and Electronics Engineers (IEEE) in 2016 "for contributions to perceptual modeling and processing of visual signals." He is also a Fellow of IET.

References 

Fellow Members of the IEEE
Living people
Academic staff of Nanyang Technological University
Singaporean engineers
Year of birth missing (living people)